Smilax azorica is a species of flowering plants of the Smilacaceae family. The species is endemic to the Azores. It was first described in 1844 as Smilax divaricata, a name that had already been given to another species. It was renamed Smilax azorica in 2009.

Description
The species is a climbing wintergreen plant. It has few or no thorns. Its leaves are ovate or cordate, almost as broad as long. The flowers are unisexual, in a simple umbel. Its fruits are red when ripe.

References

External links
Photo of Smilax azorica

Endemic flora of the Azores
Smilacaceae
Plants described in 2009